Every Struggle is the second studio album by Riyu Kosaka and her first major album since she joined record label Avex Trax. It was released on February 27, 2008. This album features 7 new tracks, as well a slight different version of "Danzai no Hana: Guilty Sky" and marks the return of Naoki Maeda as a compositor for Riyu.

Track listing

CD
M.O.N.S.T.E.R.

Dober Man
Memory
3D Heart
Platinum Smile

The Eastern Sky
Sunny the Ride
Every Struggle

DVD

Dober Man (Video Clip)
Platinum Smile (Video Clip)

Credits
M.O.N.S.T.E.R.Lyrics: Riyu KosakaComposer: RyoArranged by: Ryo
Lyrics: Riyu KosakaComposer: Love+HateArranged by: Shuhei Naruse, Love+Hate, & Kōtarō Nakagawa
Lyrics: Riyu KosakaComposer: Kazuya NagamineArranged by: Love+Hate
Dober ManLyrics: Riyu KosakaComposer: LOVE+HATEArranged by: Love+Hate
MemoryLyrics: Riyu KosakaComposer: Youichi SakaiArranged by: Youichi Sakai
3D HeartLyrics: Riyu KosakaComposer: Naoki MaedaArranged by: Naoki Maeda
Platinum SmileLyrics: Riyu KosakaComposer: Love+HateArranged by: Love+Hate
Lyrics: Riyu KosakaComposer: Youichi SakaiArranged by: Youichi Sakai
The Eastern SkyLyrics: Riyu KosakaComposer: Love+HateArranged by: Love+Hate
Sunny the RideLyrics: Riyu KosakaComposer: Shuhei NaruseArranged by: Shuhei Naruse
Every StruggleLyrics: Riyu KosakaComposer: Naoki MaedaArranged by: Naoki Maeda

Sources
Track listing: 

2008 albums
Riyu Kosaka albums